Plouasne is a commune in the Côtes-d'Armor department of Brittany in northwestern France.

The inhabitants of Plouasne are known in French as plouasnais.

Population

See also
Communes of the Côtes-d'Armor department

References

External links

Communes of Côtes-d'Armor